Sara Gwendolen Foulke (26 June 1863 – 13 December 1936)  was an American zoologist, marine biologist and poet. She worked on microscopic water inhabiting animals and her obituary described her work as "genius".

Biography 
Foulke was born at Bala Farm, Chester County, Pennsylvania, to Julia DeVeaux Powel (the daughter of John Hare Powel) and her husband, William Parker Foulke. She was initially educated at private schools and subsequently attended Bryn Mawr College and the University of Pennsylvania. Further into her career she studied and undertook research at Woods Hole Oceanographic Institution and at the Station biologique de Roscoff.

During the 1880s Foulke concentrated on researching infusoria and rotifers, microscopic water inhabiting animals. She published a number of scientific articles on the same. Later she became interested in investigating the behaviour and form of protoplasm. This led, in 1897, to Foulke published an article entitled The Living Substance as such, and as Organism as a special supplement to the Journal of Morphology. This article was initially criticised. However, by the time of her death, this work was regarded by her obituary writer Henry Van Peters Wilson, as a work of "genius".

Later in life Foulke developed an interest in child and animal psychology.

Death and publication of her book of poetry 
Foulke died on 13 December 1936 of a heart attack at her home in Baltimore. After her death her husband published her poems in a two volume set under her pseudonym Richard De Veaux.

Family 
In 1894 Foulke was married to biologist Ethan Allen Andrews. She went on to have three children with him.

Selected publications

References 

19th-century American zoologists
American marine biologists
1863 births
1936 deaths
American women biologists
American women poets
Scientists from Pennsylvania
19th-century American women scientists
Women marine biologists
Women zoologists
19th-century American poets
19th-century American women writers
20th-century American poets
20th-century American women writers
People from Chester County, Pennsylvania
Poets from Pennsylvania